The 1969–70 NCAA University Division men's ice hockey season began in November 1969 and concluded with the 1970 NCAA University Division Men's Ice Hockey Tournament's championship game on March 21, 1970, at the Olympic Arena in Lake Placid, New York. This was the 23rd season in which an NCAA ice hockey championship was held and is the 76th year overall where an NCAA school fielded a team.

In 1969 the NCAA changed their bylaws to permit freshman to play on the Varsity team. Beginning with this season universities were permitted to not only have first-year students play for their teams but to also have said players earn letters for four seasons rather than the previous limit of three. As a consequence the WCHA offered both a Sophomore-of-the-Year and Freshman-of-the-Year awards with the previous being formally retired following the campaign.

Cornell finished the 1969–70 season with an undefeated record of 29–0, only the second flawless campaign in the modern history of Division I ice hockey. The previous unblemished season (Clarkson in 1955–56), however, came with a caveat as 8 Golden Knight players were 4-year seniors (a violation of NCAA regulations at the time). As a result, the Clarkson team declined to play in the NCAA tournament. Cornell's undefeated team had no such issues and was able to compete in, and win, both their conference tournament and the NCAA tournament to become the first and thus far only undefeated NCAA champion (as of 2022).

Regular season

Season tournaments

Standings

1970 NCAA Tournament

Note: * denotes overtime period(s)

Player stats

Scoring leaders
The following players led the league in points at the conclusion of the season.

  
GP = Games played; G = Goals; A = Assists; Pts = Points; PIM = Penalty minutes

Leading goaltenders
The following goaltenders led the league in goals against average at the end of the regular season while playing at least 33% of their team's total minutes.

GP = Games played; Min = Minutes played; W = Wins; L = Losses; OT = Overtime/shootout losses; GA = Goals against; SO = Shutouts; SV% = Save percentage; GAA = Goals against average

Awards

NCAA

ECAC

WCHA

See also
 1969–70 NCAA College Division men's ice hockey season

References

External links
College Hockey Historical Archives
1969–70 NCAA Standings

 
NCAA